The England cricket team toured Scotland to play a One Day International (ODI) at The Grange Club, Edinburgh, on 10 June 2018. The match was followed by two Twenty20 Internationals (T20Is) against Pakistan on the same ground on 12 and 13 June. The last time the two teams played in an ODI against each other was in the 2015 Cricket World Cup, with England winning by 119 runs. In May 2018, Cricket Scotland named a provisional 24-man squad for the matches against England and Pakistan.

Scotland won the one-off fixture by six runs, their first ever win against England in ODIs. Man of the match, Calum MacLeod, said it was "a massive statement from Scottish cricket", with England's captain, Eoin Morgan, saying "it is huge for Scotland". In December 2018, the win against England won the Scottish team the Inspirational Performance award at the Scottish Sports Awards.

Squads

Ben Stokes and Chris Woakes were both ruled out of England's squad due to injury and were replaced by Dawid Malan and Tom Curran respectively.

Only ODI

References

External links
 Series home at ESPN Cricinfo

2018 in English cricket
2018 in Scottish cricket
June 2018 sports events in the United Kingdom
International cricket competitions in 2018
English cricket tours of Scotland